In mathematical physics, the 2D N = 2 superconformal algebra is an infinite-dimensional Lie superalgebra, related to supersymmetry, that occurs in string theory and two-dimensional conformal field theory. It has important applications in mirror symmetry.

Definition

There are two slightly different ways to describe the N = 2 superconformal algebra, called the N = 2 Ramond algebra and the N = 2 Neveu–Schwarz algebra, which are isomorphic (see below) but differ in the choice of standard basis. 

c is in the center

If  in these relations, this yields the
N = 2 Ramond algebra; while if  are half-integers, it gives the N = 2 Neveu–Schwarz algebra. The operators  generate a Lie subalgebra isomorphic to the Virasoro algebra. Together with the operators , they generate a Lie superalgebra isomorphic to the super Virasoro algebra,
giving the Ramond algebra if  are integers and the Neveu–Schwarz algebra otherwise. When represented as operators on a complex inner product space,  is taken to act as multiplication by a real scalar, denoted by the same letter and called the central charge, and the adjoint structure is as follows:

Properties
The N = 2 Ramond and Neveu–Schwarz algebras are isomorphic by the spectral shift isomorphism  of :    with inverse:   
Even integer powers of the spectral shift give automorphisms of the N = 2 superconformal algebras, called spectral shift automorphisms. Another automorphism , of period two, is given by    In terms of Kähler operators,  corresponds to conjugating the complex structure. Since , the automorphisms  and  generate a group of automorphisms of the N = 2 superconformal algebra isomorphic to the infinite dihedral group .

Constructions

Free field construction
 give a construction using two commuting real bosonic fields , 

and a complex fermionic field 

 is defined to the sum of the Virasoro operators naturally associated with each of the three systems

where normal ordering has been used for bosons and fermions.

The current operator  is defined by the standard construction from fermions

and the two supersymmetric operators  by

This yields an N = 2 Neveu–Schwarz algebra with c = 3.

SU(2) supersymmetric coset construction
Given a representation of the affine Kac–Moody algebra of SU(2) at level  with basis  satisfying

the supersymmetric generators are defined by

This yields the N=2 superconformal algebra with 

The algebra commutes with the bosonic operators 

The space of physical states consists of eigenvectors of  simultaneously annihilated  by the 's for positive  and the supercharge operator 
 (Neveu–Schwarz)
 (Ramond)
The supercharge operator commutes with the action of the affine Weyl group and the physical states lie in a single orbit of this group, a fact which implies the Weyl-Kac character formula.

Kazama–Suzuki supersymmetric coset construction
In this case the compact Hermitian symmetric space  is a Kähler manifold, for example when .

See also
Virasoro algebra
Super Virasoro algebra
Coset construction
Type IIB string theory

Notes

References

String theory
Conformal field theory
Lie algebras
Representation theory
Supersymmetry